Pingree is a surname. Notable people with the surname include:

 Chellie Pingree, Representative to the U.S. House of Representatives for Maine's 1st District
 David Pingree (1933–2005), American historian of mathematics
 Hannah Pingree, former Speaker of the Maine House of Representatives.
 Hazen S. Pingree (1840–1901), American politician
 Sally E. Pingree, American philanthropist
 Samuel E. Pingree (1832–1922), American politician and Civil War veteran

See also
 Pingree Park, Colorado, mountain campus of Colorado State University
 Pingree School, coeducational, independent secondary day school near Boston, MA.
 Pingree, North Dakota, a place named after Hazen Pingree